Man Without a Name is a 1932 German drama film directed by Gustav Ucicky and starring Werner Krauss, Helene Thimig and Mathias Wieman. It was shot at the Babelsberg Studios in Berlin. The film's sets were designed by the art directors Robert Herlth and Walter Röhrig. It was produced and distributed by UFA and premiered on 1 July 1932. It was based on a novel by Honoré de Balzac. A separate French-language version  Un homme sans nom was also produced.

Cast
Werner Krauss as Heinrich Martin
Helene Thimig as Eva-Maria Sander
Mathias Wieman as Dr. Alfred Sander
Hertha Thiele as  Helene Martin
Julius Falkenstein as Julius Hanke
Fritz Grünbaum as Erwin Gablinky
Eduard von Winterstein as Amtsrichter
Max Gülstorff as Amtsgerichtspresident
Maria Bard as Grete Schulze
Hans Brausewetter as Referendar Müller
Carl Balhaus
Alfred Beierle
Ernst Behmer
Gerhard Bienert
Gregori Chmara
Artur Menzel
Hermann Picha
Heinrich Schroth

References

External links

Films of the Weimar Republic
1932 drama films
German drama films
1930s German-language films
Films directed by Gustav Ucicky
Films based on French novels
Films based on works by Honoré de Balzac
German multilingual films
German black-and-white films
UFA GmbH films
1932 multilingual films
1930s German films
Films shot at Babelsberg Studios